Pombajira is the name of an Afro-Brazilian spirit evoked by practitioners of Umbanda and Quimbanda in Brazil. She is the consort of Exu, who is the messenger of the Orixas in Candomblé. Known by many names, or avatars, Pombajira is often associated with the number seven, crossroads, graveyards, spirit possession, and witchcraft.

Tradition
While Exu represents male sexuality, fertility and strength, Pombajira personifies female sexuality, beauty and desire. She is depicted as a beautiful woman who is insatiable. Pombajira is venerated with great respect and care because of her reputation for possessing great wrath. She is often invoked by those who seek aid in matters of the heart and love.

Pombajira is noted for her connection with both transgender women and effeminate male worshippers and is reputed to possess both.
 Some representations of Pombajira display the characteristics of being promiscuous, talkative and vulgar. However she has many avatars, and will be more or less inclined towards that behavior depending on how she manifests herself.

Avatars

Pombajira manifests in the following forms:

Dama da Noite (Lady of the Night)
Maria Mulambo da Lixeira “(Mary wretched of the trash can)”
Maria Mulambo das Sete Catacumbas “(Mary wretched of the Seven Tombs)”
Maria Padilha (Mary Padilla - First of the Marys)
Maria Quitéria “(The word “Quitéria, means war. So it would be “War Mary”)”
Pombajira Cigana (Gypsy Pombajira)
Pombajira do Ouro " (Pombagira of the Gold)"
Pombajira das Almas (Pombajira of the Souls)
Pombajira das Cobras (Pombajira of Snakes)
Pombajira das Sete Encruzilhadas (Pombajira of the Seven Crossroads)
Pombajira dos 7 Cruzeiros da Calunga (Pombajira of the Seven Crosses of Kalunga)
Pombajira da Praia (Pombajira of the Beach)
Pombajira Mirongueira (Enchantress Pombajira)
Pombajira Mocinha ou Menina(Young Girl Pombajira)
Pombajira Rainha (Queen Pombajira)
Pombajira Sete Calungas (Pombajira Seven Kalungas)
Rainha do Cemitério (Queen of the Graveyard)
Rainha Sete Encruzilhadas (Queen Seven Crossroads)
Rosa Caveira (literally Rose Skull)
Pombajira Rainha do Inferno “(Pombajira Queen of Hell)”
Pombajira 7 Saias “(Pombajira Seven skirts)”
Pombajira do Cabaré "(Night Club Pombagira)"
Pombajira Sete Saias "(Pombajira Seven Skirts)"
Pombajira das Rosas "(Pombajira of the roses)"
Pombajira das Sete Rosas (Pombajira of the Seven Roses)"

References

Bibliography

External links

Afro-American religion
Afro-Brazilian culture
Brazilian deities
Love and lust goddesses
Religious syncretism in Brazil
South American deities
Transgender in South America
Transgender topics and mythology